Daniela Seguel was the defending champion but lost in the quarterfinals to Deborah Chiesa.

Tena Lukas won the title, defeating Bárbara Gatica in the final, 6–1, 6–4.

Seeds

Draw

Finals

Top half

Bottom half

References

Main Draw

Trofeo BMW Cup - Singles